Andrew Nichol (born 1 December 1974) is a former Australian rules footballer who played for Footscray in the Australian Football League (AFL) in 1995. He was recruited from the Box Hill Football Club in the Victorian Football League (VFL) with the 37th selection in the 1995 pre-season draft.

After retiring as a player, Nichol was a junior and assistant coach, joining the Melbourne coaching group in 2011.

References

External links

Living people
1974 births
Western Bulldogs players
Box Hill Football Club players
Australian rules footballers from Victoria (Australia)